The Grand River Conservation Authority (GRCA) is a conservation authority in Ontario, Canada. It operates under the Conservation Authorities Act of Ontario. It is a corporate body, through which municipalities, landowners and other organizations work cooperatively to manage the Grand River watershed and natural resources within it.

Created in 1932 as the Grand River Conservation Commission, the GRCA is the oldest water management agency in Canada. It is one of 36 conservation authorities in Ontario and is a member of Conservation Ontario.

The GRCA also owns and manages many conservation areas, parks and trails within the watershed.

History
The Grand River provided transportation, water supply, and waterpower attracting settlement to the valley in the 19th century. The combined deforestation and urban settlement aggravated flood and drought conditions.

A main part of the Grand River's course flows through the Carolinian life zone, which contains a southern type of forest that is found only in this area of Canada. A wide variety of rare plants and animals are found here. 
 
The water quality in the river started to deteriorate to the point where it was a major public health concern. To deal with these problems, a group of eight municipalities came together in 1934 to form the Grand River Conservation Commission. The Commission completed the Shand Dam, the first multi-purpose dam in Canada, in 1942. It was built for flood control and the low flow augmentation to improve water quality during the dry summer months. The Commission also started planting trees to re-vegetate the landscape along the river.

Prior to World War II, renewable natural resources were exploited to encourage economic and industrial expansion and growth. As a result of public concern over the state of the environment in Ontario, the Province passed the Conservation Authorities Act, 1946. The Act was based on three main principles:

Initiative for the establishment and support of a conservation authority must come from the local people (all watershed municipalities).
The best unit for dealing with renewable resource conservation is the watershed.
If initiative and support were shown locally, the Ontario government would provide technical advice and financial assistance in the form of grants.

The Grand River Conservation Authority is a corporate body established to enable municipalities to jointly undertake water and natural resource management on a watershed basis - for the benefit of all. 
   
The broad goal of all conservation authorities in Ontario is specified in Section 20 of the Conservation Authorities Act:

The objects of the Authority are to establish and undertake in the area over which it has jurisdiction, a program designed to further the conservation, restoration, development and management of natural resources other than gas, oil, coal and minerals. (RSO 1990, c. 27)

Under the terms of the Act, the Grand Valley Conservation Authority was formed in 1948. This allowed all watershed municipalities to work collaboratively to address a broad range of resource management issues.

The practicality of two conservation organizations operating in the same watershed was closely scrutinized in the 1960s. To avoid potential conflict over roles and responsibilities and to eliminate duplication of programs the Grand River Conservation Authority was established in 1966 through the amalgamation of the Grand River Conservation Commission and the Grand Valley Conservation Authority.

Conservation areas

Active
 Belwood Lake Conservation Area
 Brant Conservation Area
 Byng Island Conservation Area
 Conestogo Lake Conservation Area
 Elora Gorge Conservation Area
 Elora Quarry Conservation Area
 Guelph Lake Conservation Area
 Laurel Creek Conservation Area
 Luther Marsh Wildlife Management Area
 Pinehurst Lake Conservation Area
 Rockwood Conservation Area
 Shade's Mills Conservation Area
 Bannister Lake Conservation Area
 Chesny Conservation Area
 Chilligo Conservation Area
 Dumfries Conservation Area
 Puslinch Tract Conservation Area
 Starkey Hill Conservation Area
 Taquanyah Conservation Area
 Wrigley Lake Conservation Area

Other

 The Arboretum, University of Guelph
 Avon Trail
 Blue Springs Creek Wetland Complex
 Cambridge-Paris Trail
 City of Cambridge Trails
 Chicopee Ski Club, Kitchener
 Chilligo Restoration Area, Cambridge
 Conestogo Dam
 Damascus Dam
 Dickson Wilderness Area
 Dunnville Marshes
 Elora Cataract Trail
 Emerald Lake Recreation Area
 Eramosa River Valley
 F.W.R. Dickson Wilderness Area
 Gordon Memorial Pathway, Brantford
 Grand River Forest
 Grand River Scenic Parkway
 Grand Valley
 Guelph Dam
 Guelph Lake Rotary Forest
 Guelph Radial Line Trail
 Heritage Park

 Homer Watson Park
 Homer Watson Scenic Lookout
 Hamilton-Brantford Trail
 Idylwild Park, Cambridge
 City of Kitchener Trails
 Kortright Waterfowl Park
 Laurel Creek Nature Centre
 Laurel Dam
 Lover's Leap Scenic Lookout
 Luther Dam
 Luther Marsh Wildlife Management Area
 Mohawk Island National Wildlife Area
 Murray Overlook
 Paris-Brantford Trail
 St. George Camp Ground
 Shand Dam
 Spottiswood Lake
 Sudden Tract
 Taquanyah Nature Centre
 Walter Bean Trail
 City of Waterloo Trails
 Woolwich Dam
 Town of Woolwich Trails

References

External links
 Grand River Conservation Authority
 Conservation Ontario
 Conservation Authorities Act. R.S.O. 1990, CHAPTER C.27. e-Laws. ServiceOntario. Government of Ontario.
 Conservation Authorities Act. R.R.O. 1990, REGULATION 106. CONSERVATION AREAS — GRAND RIVER. e-Laws. ServiceOntario. Government of Ontario.

Conservation authorities in Ontario
Grand River (Ontario)